Gwendolyn Anne Nagel  (née Townsend; 20 May 1946 – 17 October 2009) was New Zealand advocate for people with vision impairment, cricketer and international cricket umpire. She umpired in one Women's Test Match and three Women's One Day Internationals. She played 14 first-class matches for North Shore Women. She was a right-handed batter and bowled left-arm medium fast.

Nagel spent over 25 years advocating and working for improved educational services for blind and vision-impaired children. She was a senior lecturer at the Auckland College of Education, where she was the coordinator of the Postgraduate Diploma in Education of Students with Vision Impairment. She spent many years as a vision research teacher, travelling to schools across the North Island to teach blind students. She also served as chief executive of the Vision Education Agency. In the 2009 New Year Honours, Nagel was appointed a Companion of the Queen's Service Order, for services to special education.

References

1946 births
2009 deaths
New Zealand women cricketers
New Zealand Test cricket umpires
Companions of the Queen's Service Order
Cricketers from Auckland
New Zealand One Day International cricket umpires